The Little Belt affair was a naval battle on the night of 16 May 1811. It involved the United States frigate  and the British sixth-rate , a sloop-of-war, which had originally been the Danish ship Lillebælt, before being captured by the British in the 1807 Battle of Copenhagen. The encounter took place off the North Carolina coast.
The Little Belt Affair was one of many incidents and events that led to the War of 1812.

Background 
The Little Belt affair occurred four years after the Chesapeake–Leopard affair of 1807, in which  had attacked , killing three, wounding eighteen, and putting four of her sailors on trial for desertion. It was fifteen days after an incident involving , a frigate.

Affair

Chase
Commodore John Rodgers, commanding the frigate President, had left Annapolis several days earlier and was aware of the Guerriere incident. He was off the Virginia Capes and sailing up the coast towards New York. Little Belt was sighted to the east at about noon on 16 May. Believing her to be Guerriere, Rodgers pursued. Little Belts captain, Arthur Bingham, had spotted President one hour earlier. Bingham signaled President asking for identification but received none, but he noticed a blue pennant showing the ship's nationality was American. Bingham continued south, but Rodgers continued his pursuit because he wanted to know the stranger's identity. By 15:30, President was close enough for Rodgers to make out part of the British ship's stern. The angle at which he saw her made her appear larger than she was. Little Belt was much smaller than President, displacing only 460 tons in contrast to  Presidents 1,576. The sloop mounted 20 guns, while President carried 56.

Battle
The British and American accounts disagree on what followed. As President closed with Little Belt, Bingham thought the frigate was maneuvering to rake his ship with gunfire. Bingham wore ship three times to avoid the threat. The ships were not within hailing range until long after sunset. At about 10:15, each captain demanded the other identify his ship. Each refused to answer before the other. Each captain later claimed he had been the first to ask. Shortly after this a shot was fired, but it is disputed who shot it. The ships were soon engaged in a battle which the sloop had no chance of winning. After fifteen minutes, most of Bingham's guns had been put out of action, and Rodgers ordered a cease fire. President returned and Rodgers asked Bingham if he had struck. Bingham replied he had not, and President withdrew.

Aftermath
President had only one man injured. Little Belt suffered nine dead and 23 injured (two of them fatally). The sloop was also badly damaged in the encounter. The next morning, Lieutenant John Creighton went from President to Little Belt to lament the affair and offer Bingham space at any American port, which he declined. Bingham asked why President had attacked his much smaller ship. Creighton said it was because Little Belt had "provoked" the action. Bingham rejected the charge.

The British and American governments argued about the encounter for months. Rodgers insisted that he had mistaken the sloop for a frigate and was adamant that Bingham had fired first. The Admiralty expressed their confidence in Bingham and promoted him to post-captain on 7 February 1812.

On 19 August 1812, after war had finally broken out, HMS Guerriere sailed into her ill-fated action against . Painted across her foretopsail were the words "NOT THE LITTLE BELT".

See also
Timeline of the War of 1812
Chesapeake–Leopard affair

Footnotes

References

 Naval Chronicle, Vol. 26, pp. 37–38
 Naval Chronicle, Vol. 27, pp. 57–58

External links 
 USS President

Conflicts in 1811
Naval battles involving the United Kingdom
Naval battles involving the United States
War of 1812
May 1811 events
Combat incidents